The Jamaica Wine House, known locally as "the Jampot", is located in St Michael's Alley, Cornhill, in the heart of London's financial district. It was the first coffee house in London and was visited by the English diarist Samuel Pepys in 1660.  It is now a Grade II listed public house and is set within a labyrinth of medieval courts and alleys in the City of London. It lies in the ward of Cornhill.

The Jamaica Wine House has historic links with the sugar trade and slave plantations of the West Indies and Turkey.  There is a plaque on the wall which reads "Here stood the first London Coffee house at the sign of the Pasqua Rosee's Head 1652."  Pasqua Rosée, the proprietor, was the servant of a Levant Company merchant named Daniel Edwards, a trader in Turkish goods, who imported the coffee and assisted Rosée in setting up the establishment. The coffee house, which opened in 1652, is known in some accounts as The Turk's Head.

The building that currently stands on the site is a 19th-century public house. This pub's licence was acquired by Shepherd Neame and the premises were reopened after a restoration that finished in April 2009.

There is a wood-panelled bar with three sections on the ground floor and downstairs restaurant.

See also
 English coffeehouses in the seventeenth and eighteenth centuries

References

1652 establishments in England
Grade II listed pubs in the City of London
Coffeehouses and cafés in London